Scampolo is a 1941 Italian comedy film directed by Nunzio Malasomma and starring Lilia Silvi, Amedeo Nazzari and Carlo Romano. The story is based on a play by Dario Niccodemi which has been adapted for the screen a number of times.

The film's sets were designed by the art director Ottavio Scotti. It was shot at the Palatino Studios in Rome.

Cast
 Lilia Silvi as Scampolo 
 Amedeo Nazzari as Tito Sacchi 
 Carlo Romano as Gerardo Bernini 
 Luisa Garella as Franca 
 Nice Raineri as Giulia Bernini 
 Giacomo Almirante as Il maestro Giglioli 
 Guglielmo Barnabò as Fallotti 
 Mario Siletti as Gastone 
 Anita Durante as La proprietaria della stireria 
 Arturo Bragaglia as Ernesto 
 Gildo Bocci as Il fioraio 
 Toscano Giuntini as Il portiere 
 Armandina Bianchi as Una stiratrice 
 Lina Tartara Minora

References

Bibliography 
 Piero Pruzzo & Enrico Lancia. Amedeo Nazzari. Gremese Editore, 1983.

External links 
 

1941 films
Italian comedy films
Italian black-and-white films
1941 comedy films
1940s Italian-language films
Films directed by Nunzio Malasomma
Films set in Rome
Minerva Film films
Films shot at Palatino Studios
1940s Italian films